The Louis C. Clark Sanctuary is located on Valentine's Road in Old Brookville in Nassau County, New York on Long Island.

The  sanctuary was once a part of Valentine Farm. It was donated by Frances S. Weeks to The Nature Conservancy in 1965 in memory of her son, Louis C. Clark. In 2012, the property was transferred to the North Shore Land Alliance.

The sanctuary protects a freshwater marsh and swamp that is part of the Cedar Swamp Creek watershed. The swamp is characterized by cattail, buttonbush, red maple and tupelo; in addition, over 150 species of wildflowers and 25 species of shrubs and vines are found within the preserve. The James Preserve is located across Valentine's Road from the property.

References

External links
NY-NJ-CT Botany Online: Hiking Louis C. Clark Sanctuary

Nature reserves in New York (state)
Protected areas of Nassau County, New York
1965 establishments in New York (state)
Protected areas established in 1965